Bradford Glacier is a glacier flowing north from Mount Dewey into Comrie Glacier, on the west coast of Graham Land. It was mapped by the Falkland Islands Dependencies Survey from photos taken by Hunting Aerosurveys Ltd in 1956–57, and named by the UK Antarctic Place-Names Committee for Samuel C. Bradford (1878–1948), English documentalist who was a pioneer advocate of scientific information services.

See also
 List of glaciers in the Antarctic
 Glaciology

References
 

Glaciers of Graham Coast